Writing Systems Research is a peer-reviewed academic journal, founded in 2009, relating to the analysis, use and acquisition of writing systems. The editors in chief are Bene Bassetti (University of Warwick) and Jyotsna Vaid (Texas A & M University). It is indexed and abstracted by SCOPUS.

The journal ceased publication in 2019.

See also
List of applied linguistics journals

References 

Taylor & Francis academic journals
Linguistics journals